Alexander George Clare (c. 1985) is an English singer and songwriter. His debut album, The Lateness of the Hour, was released in the UK on 11 July 2011 on Island Records and was produced by Mike Spencer and Major Lazer.

His biggest hit, "Too Close", peaked at number 4 on the UK Singles Chart and number 7 on the US Billboard Hot 100. The song was nominated for the Brit Award for Best British Single at the 2013 Brit Awards.

Early life
Clare was born and raised in Southwark and Bromley in South London, England. He grew up listening to his father's jazz records; Clare described the experience as a "...benefit of having a dad who was born in 1936... very much into bebop and cool jazz. I just loved it.” That drew the young Clare to blues and soul artists such as Donny Hathaway and Stevie Wonder, which eventually led to interests in drum and bass, dubstep and UK garage. Though he took up the trumpet and drums when he was young, he eventually placed an emphasis on guitar and songwriting, playing open mic nights with original material.

Clare attended Bishop Challoner School in Bromley and then Westminster Kingsway College from 2002, studying for an National Vocational Qualification (NVQ) in catering.

Music career 
A demo earned him a deal with the Island label in the UK. His debut album, The Lateness of the Hour, produced by Mike Spencer and Major Lazer was released in July 2011. The first single from the album was "Up All Night", followed by "Too Close" and "Treading Water".

On 19 May 2011, Reggie Yates made Alex Clare's cover of Prince's "When Doves Cry" his Song of the Day. A day later, the Dutch radio station 3FM announced single "Too Close" to be the '3FM's Megahit of that week.

On 21 June 2011, Clare performed at the Queens' College, Cambridge May Ball. On 14 August 2011, Clare performed at the Summer Well festival in Buftea, Romania. Following the disappointing performance of the album, Clare was dropped from his record contract with Universal Island in the UK.

In March 2012, Clare's song "Too Close" was featured in several Internet Explorer 9 advertisements. Following its use, the song debuted at number 68 on the US Billboard Hot 100, and later reached number 7, becoming his first top 10 hit. Clare saw success on the German charts too, reaching number one. On 13 May 2012, Clare's song peaked at number 4 on the UK Singles Chart. Soon after the song appearance in charts, Universal Republic signed Clare to a distribution deal that allowed The Lateness of the Hour to be released in America in March 2012. In mid-2012, it was announced that Universal Republic was going defunct moving artists from its roster to Republic Records including Alex Clare.

In May 2014, Clare released the video for his single "War Rages On" as the lead single from his second album Three Hearts, which was released on 11 August 2014. "War Rages On" has also served as the title sequence to the popular BBC Drama, Our Girl. On 8 October 2014, ASCAP named members Alex Clare and Jim Duguid Songwriters of the Year for "Too Close".

In October 2016, Clare's first single from his debut album, "Up All Night" was used as the opening theme for BBC Three science-fiction series Class.

In November 2016, he released the album Tail of Lions. The name is based on a Jewish proverb emphasizing correctness over power.

It was announced in July 2018 that Clare would be releasing an acoustic album called Three Days at Greenmount, to be released on 14 September 2018. The album, which features stripped-back versions of previous songs as well as unreleased tracks, was recorded during a three-day studio session in Leeds over the summer of 2017.

In October 2021, Clare released a new single, "Why Don't Ya", through ONErpm. The song, a ballad written for his wife following a personal tragedy, marked the end of a five-year hiatus from the music industry. Clare also revealed that he had been working on new songs with songwriter/producer Jamie Hartman during the COVID-19 lockdown and was planning a new EP for early 2022.

Collaborations with other artists include:

 Diplo and Switch (2011) produced and co-wrote material on Clare's first album.
 Rudimental (2012). Clare performed a short solo on the single Not Giving In.
 Jeff Wayne and Liam Neeson (2012): Clare sang the role of Voice of Humanity (Thunder Child) on the album Jeff Wayne's Musical Version of The War of the Worlds – The New Generation along with Gary Barlow, Joss Stone and Liam Neeson.
 Aqualung and Dan Wilson (2014) cowrote material for Three hearts.
 Bakermat (2016). Clare was singer for the single Living.
 Don Diablo (2018). Clare was singer for Heaven to Me and Give it All.
 Jamie Hartman and Ivor Novello (2021). Cowriters for Why Don't Ya.

Clare is also an international speaker, and has appeared in several sessions of South Africa's Sinai Indaba program.

Personal life
Brought up in what he has described as a "very, very secular" environment (though he always believed in God), Clare became a baal teshuva to Orthodox Judaism in the mid-2000s. As such, he does not perform, travel or work on Shabbat or on Jewish holidays. He has said that he lost one-record deal opportunity due to this observance, but has found other ways to continue his career successfully. Clare also keeps a strictly kosher diet, and maintains a schedule of Talmud study on tour. He lost an album deal with Island Records because he had to turn down a radio concert for BBC in observance of the Succoth holiday in October 2011.

Though his parents remain secular, they are supportive of his lifestyle.

In 2006, before gaining critical success, Clare dated British singer Amy Winehouse, but the relationship lasted about a year. They met while he was performing and working at a bar she frequented, the Hawley Arms in Camden, North London.

He lived in Golders Green, an area in northwest London, before moving to Jerusalem in late 2015 together with his wife and daughter. He and his wife had a daughter c. 2013 and a son c. 2015, and later had a third child.

Discography

Studio albums

Acoustic albums

Singles

As lead artist

As featured artist

Other appearances

Music videos

As lead artist

As featured artist

Awards and nominations

References

External links

Living people
Baalei teshuva
English male singers
English male singer-songwriters
English multi-instrumentalists
English Orthodox Jews
English soul singers
Jewish singers
People from Golders Green
People from Southwark
Republic Records artists
Singers from London
21st-century English singers
21st-century British male singers
Year of birth missing (living people)